Moinhos de Vento Park (Portuguese: Parque Moinhos de Vento, literally "Windmills Park"), popularly known as Parcão (literally "Big Park"), is a well-known park in Porto Alegre. It is located in the Moinhos de Vento neighborhood.

The park structure consists of soccer, tennis and volleyball fields, gym equipment, a playground, a kids library, a pond with fish, turtles and ducks, a playground, and a replica of an Azorean windmill. The park also features a monument commemorating Castelo Branco.

References

Parks in Porto Alegre